J0815+4729, abbreviated from SDSS J081554.26+472947.5, is a star with an ultra-low metallicity in the constellation of Lynx. It also has a relatively high concentration of carbon. The surface of the star has temperature 6,215 K. It is at a distance of 7,500 light years (2.3 kiloparsecs) from the Sun, and is 33,000 light-years (10 kiloparsecs) from the Galactic Center.
Its [Fe/H] was first believed to be below –5.8 dex, making it the lowest metallicity un-evolved star detected., but was revised to -5.49 dex in 2020.

J0815+4729's ratio of carbon to iron, [C/Fe] is at least 5.0 dex. The star is also heavily enriched in nitrogen and oxygen, originating from primordial gas cloud contaminated by single zero-metallicity supernova. The lack of heavy elements, including iron, is explained by these mostly falling back to collapsing supernova remnant.

References

F-type main-sequence stars
Lynx (constellation)

Population II stars